Windex is an American brand of glass and hard-surface cleaners—originally in glass containers, later in plastic ones.

Drackett sold the Windex brand to Bristol-Meyers in 1965. S. C. Johnson acquired Windex in 1993 and has been manufacturing it since.

The original Windex was yellow. Today, there are varieties marketed in several colors (ocean fresh blue, sunshine lemon, and citrus orange) and fragrances (spring bouquet, ocean mist, lavender, and tea tree), with a number of additives such as vinegar, lemon, lime, or orange juice.

Ingredients
On August 26, 1969, Melvin E. Stonebraker and Samuel P. Wise received U.S. patent #3,463,735 for a glass cleaning composition, listing example formulae, one of which is 4.0% isopropyl alcohol, 1% ethylene glycol monobutyl ether, 0.1% sodium lauryl sulfate (a surfactant), calcium (Ca) 0.01%, tetrasodium pyrophosphate (a water softener), 0.05% of 28% ammonia, 1% of a dye solution, and 0.01% perfume.  This formula was not only inexpensive to manufacture but allowed the product to be packaged in glass bottles and dispensed with a plastic sprayer. 

In 1989, Windex was a 5% ammonia solution. The product was reformulated in 2006. In 2009, S.C. Johnson started publishing ingredients for all of its products, including Windex. The S.C. Johnson website lists Windex's ingredients as water, 2-hexoxyethanol, isopropanolamine, sodium dodecylbenzene sulfonate, lauramine oxide, ammonium hydroxide, fragrance, and Liquitint sky blue dye. An alternative variant also for household use cites water, hexoxyethanol, isopropanolamine, ammonium hydroxide, sodium C10-C16 alkylbenzenesulfonate, lauramine oxide, sodium xylene sulfonate, colorants, and fragrances.

Competition
Windex's main competitor in the window cleaning market is Glass Plus, a glass cleaning product produced by Reckitt Benckiser, which Windex's current owner S. C. Johnson & Son was required to divest to gain the approval of the Federal Trade Commission to acquire Dow Chemical Company's DowBrands consumer products division (the original owner of the Glass Plus brand).

References

 "Don’t Let the Blue Fool You: New Logo on Windex® Bottle to Highlight Company's Greenlist™ Process", S.C. Johnson press release, Racine, Wisconsin, Thursday, January 17, 2008
 "Philip W. Drackett: Earned profits, plaudits" by Barry M. Horstman, Cincinnati Post, May 21, 1999.

External links
 Windex's official website
 Common Household Product Material Safety and Data Sheets

Products introduced in 1933
Cleaning product brands
Household chemicals
S. C. Johnson & Son brands
Windows
1993 mergers and acquisitions